Tomb KV39 in Egypt's Valley of the Kings is one of the possible locations of the tomb of Pharaoh Amenhotep I. It is located high in the cliffs, away from the main valley bottom and other royal burials. It is in a small wadi that runs from the east side of Al-Qurn, directly under the ridge where the workmen's village lies.

Not only is the location unusual, the layout of the tomb is unique as well. It has two axes, one east and one south. It was discovered by Macarious and Andraos, who were working for Victor Loret, but was not fully examined. When excavated and re-examined in the 1990s by John Rose, dockets for Thutmose I, Amenhotep I, and possibly Thutmose II were found. The site was further examined in 2002 by Ian Buckley; his team corrected the rough plan and recovered pottery shards for later examination.

See also
Another possible location of Amenhotep I's tomb is Tomb ANB.

References

External links
Theban Mapping Project: KV39 includes detailed maps of most of the tombs.

1899 archaeological discoveries
Valley of the Kings
Amenhotep I